The 1969–70 season is Real Madrid Club de Fútbol's 67th season in existence and the club's 38th consecutive season in the top flight of Spanish football.

Summary
The club finished in a disappointing sixth place marking the end of "Ye-yé" era, six points below of Champion Atlético Madrid. For second consecutive year, in European Cup the team was early eliminated in Eightfinals by underdog Belgian side Standard Liège losing the two legs of the series in two weeks.

During June in Copa del Generalísimo the club advanced stages, in Quarterfinals defeated CF Barcelona 2–0 in Madrid and a controversial draw 1–1 in the second leg was suspended by referee Guruceta five minutes before the ending due to fans rioting on the field. Eventually the squad won the Final against Valencia CF at Estadio del CF Barcelona, with the national cup title serving as a consolation in the first campaign since 1952–53 where the club did not clinch a League title, neither a European Cup. Also, Amancio won the Pichichi Trophy scoring 16 goals tied along José Eulogio Gárate and Luis Aragonés.

Squad

Transfers

Competitions

La Liga

Position by round

League table

Matches

Copa del Generalísimo

Round of 32

Round of 16

Quarter-finals

Semi-finals

Final

European Cup

First round

Round of 16

Statistics

Players statistics

See also
 Yé-yé (Real Madrid)

References

External links
 BDFútbol

Real Madrid CF seasons
Real Madrid